Toilet Bowl may refer to:

 Toilet, a sanitation fixture used primarily for the disposal of human excrement and urine
 A natural large tidepool at Hanauma Bay, on Oahu, Hawaii
 Any football game between two very poor teams and/or of a very poor standard of play; see bowl game
 The 1983 Oregon State vs. Oregon football game
 A basketball term for when the ball circles the rim before falling